Sylvester Pemberton, alternately known as The Star-Spangled Kid and Skyman, is a superhero in the DC Comics universe. Sylvester first appeared in Star Spangled Comics #1 (October 1941) and was created by Jerry Siegel and Hal Sherman.

Starting October 1941, the character headlined his own comic, Star Spangled Comics, which introduced his sidekick, Stripesy. Fall 1941 was a boom period for patriotic superheroes as the country prepared to enter World War II; during this period, comic book publishers also launched Miss Victory, Miss America, U.S. Jones, the Fighting Yank, the Flag, Captain Flag and Yank and Doodle, among others.

The Star-Spangled Kid and his sidekick, Stripesy, appeared in Star Spangled Comics until issue #86 (November 1948). The comic continued after that, primarily as a vehicle for Robin the Boy Wonder. In issue #131 (August 1952), the book was renamed Star Spangled War Stories. The Star-Spangled Kid also appeared in World's Finest Comics from 1942 to 1945.

A version of Sylvester Pemberton, now named Starman, appeared on Stargirl portrayed by Joel McHale as the former leader of the JSA.

Fictional character biography

Star-Spangled Kid
The original Star-Spangled Kid was Sylvester Pemberton, a Golden Age character. He became the Star-Spangled Kid in order to battle enemies spies and fifth columnists during World War II and Cold War maybe. Sylvester was a spoiled, pampered rich kid who snuck out of the house to fight crime and evil; his parents never suspected what their son was up to.

He was unique in that he was a kid superhero who operated with an adult sidekick, Stripesy a.k.a. Pat Dugan, the family's chauffeur. Both he and Dugan were superb acrobats and had sufficient training in hand-to-hand combat. They devised a series of acrobatic maneuvers that allowed them to build upon one another's strengths: the Kid's agility and Dugan's prowess. They also built the Star Rocket Racer, a bubble-topped limousine with the functions of a rocket and helicopter.

According to Jess Nevins' Encyclopedia of Golden Age Superheroes, the Kid's enemies "range from ordinary criminals and Axis agents to the mad scientist Dr. Weerd, False Face, the Black Magician, the moon-mad Moonglow, Presto the criminal magician, and the rope-gimmick using Rope."

The Kid and Stripesy were members of the Seven Soldiers of Victory as well as the All-Star Squadron. In 1948, Pemberton and Dugan were joined by Merry, the Girl of 1000 Gimmicks, who supplanted The Kid and Stripsey from their own feature.

The Seven Soldiers were lost in time and rescued decades later by the Justice League of America and the Justice Society of America. Aquaman, Wildcat and the Silver Age Green Lantern rescued the Star-Spangled Kid, who was 50,000 years in the past and hiding in a cave so his flu would not wipe out humanity. Sylvester then joined the JSA, at which time a then-injured Starman loaned him his cosmic rod (it was later revealed that Starman wanted the young man to become his heir as neither of his sons expressed interest in carrying the mantle). Soon afterward, the Kid refined the technology of the rod, devising a belt with similar powers such as energy projection, flight and matter transmutation. Eventually, Sylvester temporarily retired from superheroics to reclaim his inheritance and his father's business, plus movie studio Stellar Studios, from his corrupt nephew, who was using those funds to run his own evil organization, Strike Force. In addition, he patched up his long-neglected relationship with Dugan and later became the hero known as Skyman post-Crisis after founding the heroic group known as Infinity, Inc.

Skyman

Sylvester eventually changed his name to Skyman and took leadership of the team Infinity Inc. During this period he formed a partnership with the city of Los Angeles to commission the team as for-hire protectors. He also purchased property to revitalize related movie production facilities.

He later confronted Solomon Grundy, who was under the control of the third Harlequin. She herself was under the employ of the Dummy's Injustice Unlimited. During the incident, Solomon Grundy used the fatal touch of Mr. Bones to kill Skyman.

The second Star-Spangled Kid
Pat Dugan's stepdaughter, Courtney Whitmore, finds Sylvester's Star-Spangled Kid suit and cosmic belt and Pat's old Stripesy costume while snooping through Dugan's belongings. She steals Sylvester's suit and belt and, after redesigning the suit, calls herself the second Star-Spangled Kid, but only in order to annoy Pat as revenge for him marrying her mother and moving her family to a new state. She later changes her name to Stargirl after an adventure confronting her convict father to resolve her issues with her personal life.

Sylvester, as Star-Spangled Kid, later returned with the JSA due to an alternate timeline in post-Crisis continuity to assist the Justice Society against Extant, when multiple alternate timelines came together due to Extant's attempt to collapse reality into a timeline of his creation. During this adventure, he teams up with Courtney and offered to teach her some more about the staff. While the crisis ended before he had the chance to give her further lessons, he assured her that, from what he had seen, she already understood enough about the staff's power for Sylvester to know that it was in good hands.

52
In the series 52, Lex Luthor bought the rights to Infinity Inc.'s name from the Pemberton Estate and gave the codename "Skyman" to a new superhero named Jacob Colby. Jacob had a relationship with Natasha Irons, and was portrayed as one of the more sincere heroes in Luthor's Infinity Inc. He was later killed and replaced by the shapeshifting Everyman.

Powers and abilities
Star-Spangled Kid has no superpowers, but is a superb athlete and hand-to-hand combatant. For a time he used Starman's cosmic rod. Later, he wore a "cosmic converter belt" which enabled him to fly, increased his strength and agility, and gave him the ability to create solid light objects and project energy blasts. When he reconfigured the belt into his new costume as Skyman, he initially only had the power of flight, but as time went on, he modified the suit so it possessed all of the other powers that the converter belt had as well.

In other media
 Sylvester Pemberton / Star-Spangled Kid appears in the Smallville two-part episode Absolute Justice, portrayed by Jim Shield. This version wielded the Cosmic Staff and is a member of the Justice Society of America (JSA) who previously operated in the 1970s. After learning Icicle II is killing his teammates, Pemberton warns Chloe Sullivan before sacrificing himself to save her while the Cosmic Staff eventually ends up in Courtney Whitmore's possession.
 An amalgamated incarnation of Sylvester Pemberton appears in Stargirl, portrayed by Joel McHale. In addition to operating as the Star-Spangled Kid as a teenager, this version went on to operate as Starman, leader of the Justice Society of America (JSA) whose costume is inspired by his time as Skyman. Ten years prior to the series, he and the JSA were attacked by the Injustice Society of America (ISA). The ISA's leader Icicle wounded Pemberton, but the latter's sidekick and friend Pat Dugan evacuated him. In his apparent dying moments, he urged Dugan to find someone worthy to wield his Cosmic Staff and ensure the JSA's legacy survives. In the present, Courtney Whitmore finds the Cosmic Staff and uses it to become Pemberton's successor, Stargirl, and form a new JSA. Meanwhile, due to the Cosmic Staff altering Pemberton's physiology, he entered a state of suspended animation when Icicle attacked him before Whitmore's bond with the Staff reawakened him. In the two-part season one finale, "Stars and S.T.R.I.P.E.", Pemberton searches for Dugan in California. In season two, he continues his search before eventually reaching Blue Valley and helping Whitmore's JSA defeat Eclipso. In season three, he is attacked and killed by the Ultra-Humanite, who transplants his brain into Pemberton's body to secretly manipulate Stargirl's JSA into crippling themselves as part of Icicle's revenge plot against them. After the JSA defeat Icicle and the Ultra-Humanite, they eventually succeed in reviving Pemberton once more years later.

References

External links
 JSA Fact File: Star-Spangled Kid I
 Earth-2 Star-Spangled Kid Index
 DCU Guide: Star Spangled Kid
 Star-Spangled Kid and Stripesy at Don Markstein's Toonopedia Archived from the original on March 16, 2017. Additional WebCitation archive on June 4, 2017.

Comics characters introduced in 1941
DC Comics superheroes
Earth-Two
Fictional acrobats
Fictional World War II veterans
Golden Age superheroes
United States-themed superheroes
Characters created by Jerry Siegel
Vigilante characters in comics